Kamila Stösslová (née Neumannová; 1891–1935) was a Czech woman. The composer Leoš Janáček, upon meeting her in 1917 in the Moravian resort town of Luhačovice, fell deeply in love with her, despite the fact that both of them were married, and that he was almost forty years older than she was. She was a profound influence on the composer in his last decade.

Kamila was at the time living in Luhačovice with her husband, David Stössel, and their two sons, Rudolf (born 1913) and Otto (born 1916). David was in the army and assisted Janáček in obtaining vital food supplies in wartime. David Stössel's army service may have meant he could be at Luhačovice only on some days, thus giving Janáček opportunities to converse with Kamila. Janáček arrived in the resort on 3 July 1917 (he preferred Luhačovice over other spas due to its proximity to his house in Brno). By 8 July he had jotted down a fragment of her speech in his diary. His correspondence with Kamila had begun with a brief note by 24 July 1917.

Despite her ambivalence about his feelings for her, Janáček was inspired by her to create the lead characters of three of his operas; Káťa in Katya Kabanová, the vixen in The Cunning Little Vixen and Emilia Marty in The Makropulos Affair. Other works that were inspired by her include The Diary of One Who Disappeared, the Glagolitic Mass, his Sinfonietta and the String Quartet No. 2 (subtitled Intimate Letters).

While many of these works reveal a realization by the composer that his love for her was unrequited, she was nonetheless the subject of intense correspondence. There are over 700 letters that bear witness to his intense obsession with Kamila. During the final year of his life, he wrote to Kamila almost every day. Although she always remained emotionally aloof, she was with him when he died in 1928.

In the award-winning TV film In Search of Janáček, written and directed by Petr Kaňka, her character was performed by Zuzana Vejvodová.

Further reading
 John Tyrrell, Intimate Letters: Leoš Janáček to Kamila Stösslová, Faber and Faber, (2005), .

1891 births
1935 deaths
Czech women